Tadeusz Jan Obłój (born August 29, 1950) is a former Polish ice hockey player. He played for the Poland men's national ice hockey team at the 1972 Winter Olympics in Sapporo, the 1976 Winter Olympics in Innsbruck, and the 1980 Winter Olympics in Lake Placid.

References

1950 births
Living people
Baildon Katowice players
Ice hockey players at the 1972 Winter Olympics
Ice hockey players at the 1976 Winter Olympics
Ice hockey players at the 1980 Winter Olympics
Olympic ice hockey players of Poland
Polish ice hockey centres
Sportspeople from Katowice